Cynthia Marie Rufe (née Favata; born October 30, 1948) is a Senior United States district judge of the United States District Court for the Eastern District of Pennsylvania.

Early life and education
Born in Philadelphia, Pennsylvania, Rufe graduated from Adelphi University with her Bachelor of Arts degree in 1970 and later from University at Buffalo Law School with a Juris Doctor in 1977.

Legal career
Following law school graduation, Rufe served as a public defender in Bucks County, Pennsylvania, spending much of her tenure there in the juvenile division.  She became a deputy public defender in 1980. Soon thereafter, she left government service to practice privately. She practiced in her own firm for 11 years, gaining prominence in the local legal community. In 1994, she was elected as a judge of the Bucks County Court of Common Pleas, where she served for eight years, until 2002.

Federal judicial service
On the recommendation of Senators Arlen Specter and Rick Santorum, Rufe was nominated to the United States District Court for the Eastern District of Pennsylvania by President George W. Bush on January 23, 2002 to a seat vacated by Norma Levy Shapiro. Rufe was confirmed by the Senate on April 30, 2002 on a Senate vote and received her commission on May 3, 2002. She assumed senior status on December 31, 2021.

References

Sources

1948 births
Living people
21st-century American judges
21st-century American women judges
Adelphi University alumni
Judges of the United States District Court for the Eastern District of Pennsylvania
Judges of the Pennsylvania Courts of Common Pleas
Lawyers from Philadelphia
Public defenders
United States district court judges appointed by George W. Bush
University at Buffalo alumni
University at Buffalo Law School alumni